Delhi Unified School District is a public school district based in Merced County, California.

References

External links
 

School districts in Merced County, California